Vendaphaea is a monotypic genus of African corinnid sac spiders containing the single species, Vendaphaea lajuma. It was first described by C. R. Haddad in 2009, and has only been found in South Africa.

References

Endemic fauna of South Africa
Corinnidae
Monotypic Araneomorphae genera
Spiders of South Africa